Cayalti District is one of twenty districts of the province Chiclayo in Peru.

References